Odnes is a village in Søndre Land Municipality in Innlandet county, Norway. The village is located on the north side of the Randsfjorden along County Road 33 and it is named after the nearby Odnes farm.

Skiing
Odnes is known for the large Odnes ski jump ( or Flubergbakken), which was dismantled in 2008 after much discussion. Birger Ruud set the world record in ski jumping here in 1931, jumping , and Johanna Kolstad set the women's world record at  the same year.

References

Søndre Land
Villages in Innlandet